Betty is the surname of:

 Garry Betty (1957–2007), President and CEO of EarthLink, a large American Internet service provider
 Master Betty (1791–1874), English child actor William Henry West Betty
 Nia Faith Betty (born 2001), Canadian activist and fashion designer
 Queen Betty, early 18th century Native American tribal chief
 Sam Betty (born 1986), English rugby union player